Wu Ying-yih (born 15 January 1943) is a politician in the Republic of China who served as the Minister of the Overseas Compatriot Affairs Commission, the Overseas Chinese Affairs Commission and subsequently the Overseas Community Affairs Council of the Executive Yuan from 2008 to 2013.

Education
Wu obtained his bachelor's degree in medicine from the Department of Surgery of National Taiwan University in 1961. He then obtained his doctoral degree in surgery from the University of Illinois College of Medicine in the United States in 1974.

Political career
Wu served as a member of the 6th Legislative Yuan after being elected in the 2004 Republic of China legislative election on 11 December 2004 and taking office on 1 February 2005.

References

Members of the 6th Legislative Yuan
1943 births
Living people
Kuomintang Members of the Legislative Yuan in Taiwan
Politicians of the Republic of China on Taiwan from Chiayi
National Taiwan University alumni
University of Illinois alumni
Party List Members of the Legislative Yuan